The Zimmerberg Base Tunnel (ZBT) is a railway tunnel under the Zimmerberg mountains in Switzerland. Phase I of the tunnel was opened to traffic during April 2003.

The ZBT has been divided into two phases of work; as of 2020, only Phase I is operational while Phase II remains in the planning and preparation stages. Zimmerberg I is about 10 km long and links Zurich with Thalwil and bypasses a section of the Lake Zürich left-bank railway line, allowing rail traffic to traverse the mountains more efficiently than traditional routes.

Phase I
During the 1990s, Switzerland embarked upon a major programme of modernisation and improvements across its railway infrastructure. The NRLA initiative sought to provide better alternatives to the steep mountain railways across Gotthard, Ceneri and Lötschberg through the construction of a number of base-level tunnels that enabled trains to more rapidly and efficiently traverse the Swiss Alps. The Zimmerberg Base Tunnel (ZBT) was one such tunnel constructioned under the initiative.

Phase I of the Zimmerberg Base Tunnel is a major feature of the route between Zurich and Thalwil. Construction represented a major milestone in Swiss railway infrastructure, the tunnel being the longest double-track tunnel to have been constructed by the nation in excess of 100 years. The tunnel was designed to accommodate high speed transit, with trains traversing at peak speeds of up to 200 km/h. Reportedly, the projected cost of the 10.7 km Phase I section has been calculated at 820 million Swiss francs. During September 1997, construction of the tunnel commenced.

The local geography and location of the tunnel posed some challenges to the construction effort, such as the need to avoid impacting nearby urban development, as well as little cover being available at key areas. Boring operations through the rock incorporated both the use of a tunnel boring machine (TBM) along with some conventional techniques, such as blasting, soil injection, and pipe arches amongst other auxiliary construction measures intended to reduce the risk of excessive settlement. Approximately 315 meters of the tunnel's length features a continuous grouted ceiling, which was done to reduce deformation and permeability as well as a potential loss of cover. This was created by injecting a precise mixture of cement and slurry via pressurised grouting pipes across 120,000 valves; areas were tested for potential weaknesses and promptly re-grouted where appropriate.

From an early stage of the project, the tunnel's opening was projected for June 2003, a date which was fulfilled on time.

Phase II
The proposed Phase II of the Zimmerberg Base Tunnel is one element of the wider Rail 2030 programme, which has an overall projected budget of 21 billion Swiss francs. However, during 2010, it was reported that further work on the project had been put on hold indefinitely. At the time, work was underway on multiple other base tunnels, including the Ceneri Base Tunnel and the Gotthard Base Tunnel.

If it is built as per the original plans, Phase II of the tunnel will bring its length to about 20 km, and will link Zürich with Zug. Even following its completion, it is planned to retain the intermediate exit to Thalwil, which would still be used by passenger and freight trains going to Chur as well as by international trains to Austria. Until Phase II is completed, capacity and speeds both remain heavily constrained by traditional routes; the Swiss Federal parliament has voted to include the work in its long term expansion plan for 2030–2035.

See also 

 NRLA
 Ceneri Base Tunnel
 Gotthard Base Tunnel
 Lötschberg Base Tunnel
 List of longest tunnels
 Treno Alta Velocità
 Zimmerberg

References

External links 
Alptransit Gotthard AG - Official company and project site
 

Railway tunnels in Switzerland
Proposed tunnels in Switzerland
Proposed railway tunnels in Europe
Base tunnels
Gotthard railway